Simone Ruffini (born 7 December 1989) is an Italian swimmer who specializes in long-distance freestyle swimming, especially open water swimming. He won the gold medal in the Men's 25 km open water swimming at the 2015 World Aquatics Championships.

References

1989 births
Living people
Italian male swimmers
Italian male long-distance swimmers
Olympic swimmers of Italy
Swimmers at the 2016 Summer Olympics
Universiade medalists in swimming
Sportspeople from the Province of Macerata
Universiade gold medalists for Italy
Swimmers of Gruppo Sportivo Esercito
Medalists at the 2011 Summer Universiade
European Open Water Swimming Championships medalists
21st-century Italian people